Oskarshamn is a coastal city and the seat of Oskarshamn Municipality, Kalmar County, Sweden with 17,258 inhabitants in 2010.

History

Etymology
Döderhultsvik was the original name before a town charter was granted in 1856. The name was then changed to Oscarshamn (meaning: Oscar's port) after the king Oscar I of Sweden. The spelling has later changed to Oskarshamn.

Struggle for town charter
The location of Oskarshamn was known as Döderhultsvik since the Medieval age. In 1645, the city of Kalmar, to the south, made a request to the Royal Government on holding commerce in the bay there, which was granted, giving it merchancy rights as a köping. There followed 200 years of merchancies in the town, during which it was governed and dependent on Kalmar; while the surrounding towns and municipalities made frequent requests to grant it a charter, consequently turned down each of the attempts made in the years: 1786, 1798, 1800, 1815, 1818, 1823, 1825, 1830 and 1838. In 1843 it got some independence, with a local council, but the council itself was occupied by citizens of Kalmar. In 1854, King Oscar I of Sweden promised to grant it a charter as soon as it had fulfilled certain demands, including building a prison and a council hall, among other things. When they had accomplished the feats, the charter was granted, and the city became one of the Cities of Sweden starting 1856, on May 1. This status has today no legal significance, but Oskarshamn is now the seat of the much larger Oskarshamn Municipality, without being a political entity of its own.

Recent history
Industrialisation began with the inauguration of the railway line to Nässjö. From then on, industries as well as the harbour began to expand.  The biggest private employer for a long time was the Oskarshamn Shipyard, which at its height had almost 1500 employees.  But in the 1970s, the Swedish shipbuilding industry suffered a large financial crisis and many shipyards closed down. In Oskarshamn, the shipyard went through a large downsizing which left many people unemployed.

However, at around the same time, two major industries were established in Oskarshamn.  In 1966, Scania AB bought the truck cab factory, which had been building truck cabs since 1948, and started expanding.  The Scania factory is today one of the biggest employers in Kalmar county with almost 2000 employees. Liljeholmens Stearinfabriks AB, established in Oskarshamn in 1970, is the world’s largest candle manufacturer, specialized in stearin candles.

The oldest person in Sweden, Astrid Zachrison was born Åby in Fliseryd, just west of Oskarshamn. She died on her 113th birthday.

Economy 
The shipyard founded in 1863 is still active, as well as commercial and passenger shipping. Three different ferry lines transport passengers to Gotland, Öland and Blå Jungfrun.

Between 1965-1985, a nuclear power facility was constructed outside Oskarshamn. Three BWR units were built, that today delivers about 10% of Sweden's electrical supply. There is also a laboratory for research concerning long-time storage of spent nuclear fuel. The Äspö Hard Rock Laboratory is open to the public to visit.

The two top employers in Oskarshamn are Scania truck manufacturer and the OKG nuclear power plant. Other companies include Liljeholmens candle factory, battery manufacturer SAFT, Elajo, and Bygg Hemma.

Sights
In the port of Oskarshamn there are tourist boats which take visitors to the island and national park Blå Jungfrun. There are also boats that cruise the coastal waters closer to Oskarshamn. Within the municipality there is the Oskarshamn archipelago which consists of over 5, 000 islands and small islets.

In the harbor area there are some restaurants, pubs and cafés. There are also viewpoints over the harbour. On the south side of the port there is a 72-metre (236 ft) wooden bench called Långa Soffan. It was built in 1867 and it is believed to be the longest of its kind in Europe. From the bench there is a panorama view over the harbor and the quite lively shipping activity going on there. There is a marina for private boats at the innermost of the harbor.

Another panorama-view of Oskarshamn and the sea outside is obtained from the top of the town’s northern water-tower which is open to the public.

The older part of Oskarshamn is preserved fairly well. In one particular part of town there are older wooden houses originating from the 19th century. The area is called Besväret and Fnyket.

Oskarshamns Stadspark is a public park located immediately south of the towns central parts.

Fredriksbergs Herrgård is a manor-house built in 1784 situated just outside the city center of Oskarshamn. It is open for the public to visit and houses a restaurant, café and a small museum.

Climate

Oskarshamn has an oceanic climate (Cfb), mild for its latitude, with winter means slightly below freezing and summer days among the warmest in Sweden and Scandinavia. Precipitation is light to moderate, typical of Southeastern Sweden.

Culture
Oskarshamn was the home of the famous woodcarver Axel Petersson Döderhultarn. His studio, as well as the Döderhultarn Museum, contains more than 200 of his carvings. There is also a maritime museum in Oskarshamn.

At the release of The Simpsons film, Swedish newspaper Sydsvenska Dagbladet concluded that Oskarshamn is the Swedish equivalent to Springfield, the Simpsons' hometown.

Each summer there is a music festival located to the harbor area. The festival, named Latitud 57 and connected to the other international Latitude music festivals, is taking place simultaneously as the annual Oskarshamn Offshore Race which is a popular competition for powerboats. The world championship in Offshore was held here in 2011.

Education
There are four main elementary schools in Oskarshamn, Norra skolan, Vallhallaskolan, Rödsleskolan and Kristinebergskolan. There are also two high schools, Oscarsgymnasiet (the main high school) and Elajogymnsiet (specializing in electricity).

Transport
The rail traffic is today limited to a few passenger trains a day to and from Nässjö and freight trains to and from the harbour. There is also a ferry line between the town and Visby on the Swedish island of Gotland. The connection with Stockholm-Arlanda was closed down on 17 April 2014. In May 2014 there was a decision by the municipality to close down the airport totally. The nearest other airport is Kalmar Airport,  from Oskarshamn. The airport is still used for some general aviation.

Sports

IK Oskarshamn is the name of the local ice hockey team. The team has played in the highest hockey-league in Sweden, the Swedish Hockey League, since 2019.

Craftstaden IBK is the name of the floorball team which is playing in the division 1-league. IFK Oskarshamn and Oskarshamns AIK are two of the towns' soccer teams. The latter plays in the division 1-league.

During 5th to 10 July 2011, Oskarshamn hosted the world championship in offshore powerboat racing.

International relations

Twin towns – sister cities
Oskarshamn is twinned with:

Gallery

See also
Oskarshamn Maritime Museum
Oskarshamns Stadspark
Oskarshamn archipelago
Döderhultarn Museum
Blå Jungfrun
IK Oskarshamn hockey team

References

External links 
 Oskarshamn.com - Webpage with information about Oskarshamn

 
Populated places in Kalmar County
Populated places in Oskarshamn Municipality
Coastal cities and towns in Sweden
Municipal seats of Kalmar County
Swedish municipal seats
Port cities and towns of the Baltic Sea
Cities in Kalmar County